The Stornoway High Church is a place of worship of the Church of Scotland in Stornoway. The church celebrated its centenary in 2009. There is an English and Gaelic congregation in the church, the English congregation worships in the old church and the Gaelic congregation worships in the 'New Hall'.

2013 secession
At a meeting on 18 June 2013, 250 members of the church's congregation voted to leave the Church of Scotland over disagreement with its handling of the issue of gay clergy. Those who left joined later to the Free Church of Scotland and established a new congregation named Stornoway High Free Church.

References

Buildings and structures in the Isle of Lewis
Churches in the Outer Hebrides
Stornoway
Churches completed in 1909